Jessica Schlotterback (born September 13, 1970) is an American former professional tennis player. She competed under her maiden name Jessica Emmons.

Biography
A right-handed player from Phoenix, Emmons played college tennis for the UCLA Bruins, earning All-American honors in 1988 and 1989.

Emmons toured professionally in the early 1990s and reached a best singles ranking of 131. She made her grand slam main draw debut at the 1991 US Open, where she took 15th seed Helena Suková to three sets in a first-round loss. As a doubles player she featured in the main draw of all four grand slam tournaments and was ranked as high as 71 in the world.

References

External links
 
 

1970 births
Living people
American female tennis players
UCLA Bruins women's tennis players
Tennis people from Arizona
Sportspeople from Phoenix, Arizona